The Belgian railway line 124 is a railway line in Belgium connecting the cities of Brussels and Charleroi. A first section between Luttre and Charleroi was built in 1843 and the complete line, which runs 55,9 km,  was opened on June 1, 1874.

The line passes through the following stations:
 Brussels-South
 Forest-East
 Uccle-Stalle
 Uccle-Calevoet
 Linkebeek
 Holleken
 Sint-Genesius-Rode
 De Hoek
 Waterloo
 Braine-l'Alleud
 Lillois
 Nivelles
 Obaix-Buzet
 Luttre
 Courcelles-Motte
 Roux
 Marchienne-au-Pont
 Charleroi-South

References

124
124
1843 establishments in Belgium
Public transport in Charleroi
City of Brussels
Railway lines opened in 1843
3000 V DC railway electrification